Ivan Ricardo Neves Abreu Cavaleiro (born 18 October 1993) is a Portuguese professional footballer who plays for Süper Lig club Alanyaspor on loan from  club Fulham. Mainly a winger, he can also play as a forward.

A product of Benfica's youth system, he was part of the club's domestic treble in the 2013–14 season. After one-year spells with Deportivo La Coruña (Spain) and Monaco he went on to spend most of his career in England with Wolverhampton Wanderers and Fulham, signing with the former in 2016.

Cavaleiro earned 63 caps for Portugal at youth level all categories comprised, scoring 13 goals. He made his senior international debut in 2014.

Club career

Benfica
Born in Vila Franca de Xira, Lisbon District, Cavaleiro played youth football for five clubs, notably representing S.L. Benfica from ages 13–18, a loan spell notwithstanding. He made his senior debut in the 2012–13 season, playing his first Segunda Liga match with the reserves on 11 August 2012 against S.C. Braga B. The following weekend he scored his first goal(s) as a professional, grabbing a brace in a 4–2 away win over C.D. Feirense, and added another two before the end of the month in a 6–0 home rout of C.F. Os Belenenses; he finished his first year with 38 appearances and 12 goals, helping his team to the seventh position.

Cavaleiro started his second season with Benfica B in fashion, netting seven times in ten matches and earning the Second Division Player of the Month award for August/September. He made his official debut for the main squad on 19 October 2013, playing the full 90 minutes against CD Cinfães in the third round in the Taça de Portugal and assisting Ola John for the game's only goal. He appeared in his maiden match in the UEFA Champions League four days later, playing the second half of a 1–1 home draw with Olympiacos F.C. in the group stage.

On 15 January 2014, Cavaleiro scored his first competitive goal for Benfica, the last in a 2–0 win against Leixões S.C. in the campaign's Taça da Liga. On 7 August, he was loaned to Deportivo de La Coruña of the Spanish La Liga for one year, making his debut on the first matchday and opening the scoring in a 2–1 defeat at Granada CF.

Monaco
On 10 July 2015, Cavaleiro joined AS Monaco FC on a permanent deal until 2020, for a transfer fee rumoured to be €15 million. He made his debut on the 28th, starting in a 3–1 away win over BSC Young Boys in the third qualifying round of the Champions League, and scored his first goal in the second leg, opening a 4–0 victory at the Stade Louis II.

Wolverhampton Wanderers
On 31 August 2016, Cavaleiro moved to English Championship side Wolverhampton Wanderers on a five-year deal (with the option of an additional year) for an undisclosed fee, reported to be a new club-record sum of £7 million. He made his debut on 10 September in a 1–1 home draw to Burton Albion, and scored his first goal for the club 14 days later in a 3–1 win against Brentford also at Molineux Stadium.

Cavaleiro was voted the Professional Footballers' Association Fans' Championship Player of the Month for November 2017, after netting four times in as many games. The previous month, he had provided five assists to keep his team clear at the top of the table; he finished the season with nine goals from 42 appearances, adding 12 decisive passes and achieving promotion to the Premier League as champion.

Cavaleiro's first match in the English top division occurred on 29 September 2018, and he scored once in the 2–0 home victory over Southampton with his very first touch of the ball after coming on as a substitute in place of compatriot Diogo Jota.

Fulham
Cavaleiro signed for Fulham on 13 July 2019 on a season-long loan, with the option to make the move permanent afterwards. On 21 August, he put on a player of the match performance in the 4–0 home win against Millwall, scoring twice and providing one assist.

On 7 January 2020, Cavaleiro agreed to a permanent four-and-a-half-year contract. In the 2021–22 campaign, as the club returned to the top tier as champions, he dealt with several injury problems.

In September 2022, Cavaleiro was loaned to Alanyaspor of the Turkish Süper Lig for one year.

International career

Youth
Cavaleiro was named in the Portugal under-19 squad at the 2012 UEFA European Championship, playing the last match of the group stage against Greece. A year later, he represented the under-20 team at the 2013 FIFA U-20 World Cup; he appeared in four games as a substitute in Turkey, in an eventual round-of-16 exit.

Cavaleiro made his debut for the under-21s on 14 August 2013, netting a hat-trick in a 5–2 friendly win against Switzerland. On 27 June 2015, he scored Portugal's third goal in a 5–0 rout of Germany in the semi-finals of the European Championship in Czech Republic; he was named in the Team of the Tournament, in an eventual runner-up finish.

Senior
On 28 February 2014, Cavaleiro received his first callup to the Portugal senior side, for a friendly with Cameroon on 5 March. He started and played 70 minutes in the 5–1 victory in Leiria.

Cavaleiro was selected by Angola manager Pedro Gonçalves for 2022 FIFA World Cup qualifiers against Egypt and Libya on 2 and 7 September 2021, respectively. He was not included in the final squad, however.

Personal life
Cavaleiro's father, Lindo, was crowned Angolan youth champion for Atlético Petróleos de Luanda, whilst his uncle Monhé excelled as a midfielder for Progresso Associação do Sambizanga.

Career statistics

Club

Honours
Benfica
Primeira Liga: 2013–14
Taça de Portugal: 2013–14
Taça da Liga: 2013–14
UEFA Europa League runner-up: 2013–14

Wolverhampton Wanderers
EFL Championship: 2017–18

Fulham
EFL Championship: 2021–22
EFL Championship play-offs: 2020

Portugal U21
UEFA European Under-21 Championship runner-up: 2015

Individual
SJPF Segunda Liga Player of the Month: August 2013, September 2013
UEFA European Under-21 Championship Team of the tournament: 2015
Professional Footballers' Association Fans' Championship Player of the Month: November 2017

References

External links

1993 births
Living people
People from Vila Franca de Xira
Portuguese sportspeople of Angolan descent
Sportspeople from Lisbon District
Black Portuguese sportspeople
Portuguese footballers
Association football wingers
Association football forwards
Primeira Liga players
Liga Portugal 2 players
S.L. Benfica B players
S.L. Benfica footballers
La Liga players
Deportivo de La Coruña players
Ligue 1 players
Championnat National 2 players
AS Monaco FC players
Premier League players
English Football League players
Wolverhampton Wanderers F.C. players
Fulham F.C. players
Süper Lig players
Alanyaspor footballers
Portugal youth international footballers
Portugal under-21 international footballers
Portugal international footballers
Portuguese expatriate footballers
Expatriate footballers in Spain
Expatriate footballers in Monaco
Expatriate footballers in England
Expatriate footballers in Turkey
Portuguese expatriate sportspeople in Spain
Portuguese expatriate sportspeople in Monaco
Portuguese expatriate sportspeople in England
Portuguese expatriate sportspeople in Turkey